Frederick Norman "Pat" Ankenman (December 23, 1912 – January 13, 1989) was an American second baseman in Major League Baseball (MLB). He played for the St. Louis Cardinals and Brooklyn Dodgers during the 1936, 1943 and 1944 seasons. He also served as a manager in the minor leagues for the New Orleans Pelicans in 1942 and the Oklahoma City Indians in 1947 and 1948.

Ankenman was owner of Camp Ozark.

External links

1912 births
1989 deaths
Baseball players from Houston
Major League Baseball second basemen
Brooklyn Dodgers players
St. Louis Cardinals players
Texas Longhorns baseball players
Greensboro Patriots players
Houston Buffaloes players
Columbus Red Birds players
Rochester Red Wings players
Sacramento Solons players
New Orleans Pelicans (baseball) players
Montreal Royals players
Oklahoma City Indians players
Minor league baseball managers